With a total area of , New Mexico is the fifth-largest state, after Alaska, Texas, California, and Montana. On the southern border, Texas makes up the eastern two-thirds, while the Mexican states of Chihuahua and Sonora make up the western third, with Chihuahua making up about 90% of that. The western border with Arizona runs along the 109° 03'W longitude. The southwestern corner of the state is known as the Bootheel. The 37°N parallel forms the northern boundary with Colorado. The states of New Mexico, Colorado, Arizona, and Utah come together at the Four Corners in New Mexico's northwestern corner.

Despite its popular depiction as mostly arid desert, New Mexico has one of the most diverse landscapes of any U.S. state, ranging from wide, auburn-colored deserts and verdant grasslands, to broken mesas and high, snow-capped peaks. Close to a third of the state is covered in timberland, with heavily forested mountain wildernesses dominating the north. The Sangre de Cristo Mountains, the southernmost part of the Rocky Mountains, run roughly north–south along the east side of the Rio Grande, in the rugged, pastoral north. The Great Plains extend into the eastern third of the state, most notably the Llano Estacado ("Staked Plain"), whose westernmost boundary is marked by the Mescalero Ridge escarpment. The northwestern quadrant of New Mexico is dominated by the Colorado Plateau, characterized by unique volcanic formations, dry grasslands and shrublands, open pinyon-juniper woodland, and mountain forests. The Chihuahuan Desert, which is the largest in North America, extends through the south.

In addition to the Rio Grande, which is tied for the fourth-longest river in the U.S., New Mexico has four other major river systems: the Pecos, Canadian, San Juan, and Gila. Nearly bisecting New Mexico from north to south, the Rio Grande has played an influential role in the region's history; its fertile floodplain has supported human habitation since prehistoric times, and European settlers initially lived exclusively in its valleys and along its tributaries. The Pecos, which flows roughly parallel to the Rio Grande at its east, was a popular route for explorers, as was the Canadian River, which rises in the mountainous north and flows east across the arid plains. The San Juan and Gila lie west of the Continental Divide, in the northwest and southwest, respectively. With the exception of the Gila, all major rivers are dammed in New Mexico and provide a major water source for irrigation and flood control.

Aside from its rivers, New Mexico has few sizeable natural bodies of water; there are several artificial lakes and reservoirs, the largest being Elephant Butte Reservoir, which was created by the damming of the Rio Grande. At its height in the early 20th century, the reservoir was the largest man-made lake in the world.

Climate

New Mexico has long been known for its dry, temperate climate. Overall the state is semi-arid to arid, with areas of continental and alpine climates at higher elevations. New Mexico's statewide average precipitation is  a year, with average monthly amounts peaking in the summer, particularly in the more rugged north-central area around Albuquerque and in the south. Generally, the eastern third of the state receives the most rainfall, while the western third receives the least.

In the colder months of November to March, many cities in New Mexico can have nighttime temperature lows in the teens above zero, or lower.

New Mexico's stable climate and sparse population provides for clearer skies and less light pollution, making it a popular site for several major astronomical observatories, including the Apache Point Observatory, the Very Large Array, and the Magdalena Ridge Observatory, among others.

Climate data

Flora and fauna

Owing to its varied topography, New Mexico has six distinct vegetation zones that provide diverse sets of habitats for many plants and animals. The Upper Sonoran Zone is by far the most prominent, constituting about three-fourths of the state; it includes most of the plains, foothills, and valleys above 4,500 feet, and is defined by prairie grasses, low piñon pines, and juniper shrubs. The Llano Estacado in the east features shortgrass prairie with blue grama, which sustain bison. The Chihuahuan Desert in the south is characterized by shrubby creosote. The Colorado Plateau in the northwest corner of New Mexico is high desert with cold winters, featuring sagebrush, shadescale, greasewood, and other plants adapted to the saline and seleniferous soil.

The mountainous north hosts a wide array of vegetation types corresponding to elevation gradients, such as piñon-juniper woodlands near the base, through evergreen conifers, spruce-fir and aspen forests in the transitionary zone, and Krummholz, and alpine tundra at the very top. The Apachian zone tucked into the southwestern bootheel of the state has high-calcium soil, oak woodlands, Arizona cypress, and other plants that are not found in other parts of the state. The southern sections of the Rio Grande and Pecos valleys have 20,000 square miles (52,000 square km) of New Mexico's best grazing land and irrigated farmland.

New Mexico's varied climate and vegetation zones consequently support diverse wildlife. Black bears, bighorn sheep, bobcats, cougars, deer, and elk live in habitats above 7,000 feet, while coyotes, jackrabbits, kangaroo rats, javelina, porcupines, pronghorn antelope, western diamondbacks, and wild turkeys live in less mountainous and elevated regions. The iconic roadrunner, which is the state bird, is abundant in the southeast. Endangered species include the Mexican gray wolf, which is being gradually reintroduced in the world, and Rio Grande silvery minnow. Over 500 species of birds live or migrate through New Mexico, third only to California and Mexico.

Conservation 
New Mexico and 12 other western states together account for 93% of all federally owned land in the U.S. Roughly one–third of the state, or 24.7 million of 77.8 million acres, is held by the U.S. government, the tenth-highest percentage in the country. More than half this land is under the Bureau of Land Management, while another third is managed by the U.S. Forest Service.

New Mexico was central to the early–20th century conservation movement, with Gila Wilderness being designated the world's first wilderness area in 1924. The state also hosts nine of the country's 84 national monuments, the most of any state after Arizona; these include the second oldest monument, El Morro, which was created in 1906, and the Gila Cliff Dwellings, proclaimed in 1907.

Areas managed by the National Park Service include:

National Wildlife Refuges in New Mexico managed by the U.S. Fish and Wildlife Service include:
 Bitter Lake National Wildlife Refuge
 Bosque del Apache National Wildlife Refuge
 Grulla National Wildlife Refuge
 Las Vegas National Wildlife Refuge
 Maxwell National Wildlife Refuge
 San Andres National Wildlife Refuge
 Sevilleta National Wildlife Refuge
 Valle de Oro National Wildlife Refuge in the City of Albuquerque's South Valley

independent wildlife refuges in New Mexico include:
 Whitfield Wildlife Conservation Area in Valencia County · Whitfield Wildlife Conservation Area – Valencia Soil and Water Conservation District

Areas managed by the New Mexico State Parks Division:

Environmental issues

In January 2016, New Mexico sued the United States Environmental Protection Agency over negligence after the 2015 Gold King Mine waste water spill. The spill had caused heavy metals such as cadmium and lead and toxins such as arsenic to flow into the Animas River, polluting water basins of several states. The state has since implemented or considered stricter regulations and harsher penalties for spills associated with resource extraction.

New Mexico is a major producer of greenhouse gases. A study by Colorado State University showed that the state's oil and gas industry generated 60 million metric tons of greenhouse gases in 2018, over four times greater than previously estimated. The fossil fuels sector accounted for over half the state's overall emissions, which totaled 113.6 million metric tons, about 1.8% of the country's total and more than twice the national average per capita. The New Mexico government has responded with efforts to regulate industrial emissions, promote renewable energy, and incentivize the use of electric vehicles.

Settlements 

With just 17 people per square mile (6/km2), New Mexico is one of the least densely populated states, ranking 45th out of 50. By contrast, the overall population density of the U.S. is 90/mi2 (35.5/km2). The state is divided into 33 counties and 106 municipalities, which include cities, towns, villages, and a consolidated city-county, Los Alamos. Only two cities have at least 100,000 residents: Albuquerque and Las Cruces, whose respective metropolitan areas together account for the majority of New Mexico's population.

Residents are concentrated in the north-central region of New Mexico, anchored by the state's largest city, Albuquerque. Centered in Bernalillo County, the Albuquerque metropolitan area includes New Mexico's third-largest city, Rio Rancho, and has a population of over 918,000, accounting for one-third of all New Mexicans. It is adjacent to Santa Fe, the capital and fourth-largest city. Altogether, the Albuquerque–Santa Fe–Las Vegas combined statistical area includes more than 1.17 million people, or nearly 60% of the state population.

New Mexico's other major center of population is in south-central area around Las Cruces, its second-largest city and the largest city in the southern region of the state. The Las Cruces metropolitan area includes roughly 214,000 residents, but with neighboring El Paso, Texas forms a combined statistical area numbering over 1 million.

New Mexico hosts 23 federally recognized tribal reservations, including part of the Navajo Nation, the largest and most populous tribe; of these, 11 hold off-reservation trust lands elsewhere in the state. The vast majority of federally recognized tribes are concentrated in the northwest, followed by the north-central region.

Like several other southwestern states, New Mexico hosts numerous colonias, a type of unincorporated, low-income slum characterized by abject poverty, the absence of basic services (such as water and sewage), and scarce housing and infrastructure. The University of New Mexico estimates there are 118 colonias in the state, though the U.S. Department of Housing and Urban Development identifies roughly 150.  The majority are located along the Mexico-U.S. border.

See also
 Delaware Basin
 List of counties in New Mexico

Notes

References

Geography of New Mexico